Robert Bush (born March 13, 1990 in San Jose, California) is an American cyclist.

Palmares
2011
 U23 National Criterium Champion
1st stage 5 Tour de Beauce
1st stage Cascade Cycling Classic
2012
 U23 National Road Race Champion

References

1990 births
Living people
American male cyclists
Sportspeople from San Jose, California
21st-century American people